Delta Leporis (δ Leporis) is a solitary, orange-hued star in the southern constellation of Lepus. It is visible to the naked eye with an apparent visual magnitude of 3.85. Based upon an annual parallax shift of 28.68 mas, it is 114 light years distant from Earth.

This is an old, evolved K-type star with an age of about 10.7 billion years. However, Gray et al. It may be a red clump star, which indicates it is generating energy through helium fusion at its core.

At the estimated distance of this star, this yields a physical size of about 10 times the radius of the Sun. It has only 94% of the Sun's mass and is radiating 46 times the Sun's luminosity from its photosphere at an effective temperature of 4,660 K.

References

K-type giants
K-type subgiants
Horizontal-branch stars
Lepus (constellation)
Leporis, Delta
Durchmusterung objects
Leporis, 15
039364
027654
2035